Sclerolaena cornishiana, the cartwheel burr, is a species of flowering plant in the family Amaranthaceae, native to parts of northern Australia. An annual or perennial, it is an intricately branched herb with solitary flowers.

References

cornishiana
Endemic flora of Australia
Flora of Western Australia
Flora of the Northern Territory
Flora of Queensland
Plants described in 1978